Cerapteryx is a genus of moths of the family Noctuidae.

Species
 Cerapteryx graminis – antler moth (Linnaeus, 1758)
 Cerapteryx megala (Alphéraky, 1882)

References
 Cerapteryx at Markku Savela's Lepidoptera and Some Other Life Forms
Natural History Museum Lepidoptera genus database

 
Hadenini